The lesser naked-backed fruit bat (Dobsonia minor) is a species of megabat in the family Pteropodidae. It is found in Indonesia and Papua New Guinea.

References

Dobsonia
Bats of Oceania
Bats of Indonesia
Bats of New Guinea
Mammals of Papua New Guinea
Least concern biota of Oceania
Mammals described in 1879
Taxonomy articles created by Polbot
Taxa named by George Edward Dobson